Christopher Schultz (February 16, 1960 – March 4, 2021) was a Canadian professional football player who was an offensive tackle in the National Football League (NFL) and Canadian Football League (CFL). He primarily played with the CFL Toronto Argonauts. Schultz played college football at the University of Arizona. He was a sportscaster with Canadian sports television channel TSN.

Early years
Schultz attended Aldershot High School in Burlington, Ontario, where he was a part of 2 football championships. He also practiced basketball. He accepted a football scholarship from the University of Arizona.

He was recruited by Arizona head coach Tony Mason as a defensive tackle, where he played his first three years. One of the strongest players on the team, he was converted into a left tackle as a senior.

Professional career

Dallas Cowboys
Schultz was selected by the Dallas Cowboys in the seventh round (189th overall) of the 1983 NFL Draft. He was also selected by the Arizona Wranglers in the 1983 USFL Territorial Draft. On August 21, 1984, he was placed on the injured reserve list. He was activated later in the year and played in 5 games on special teams. In 1984, he was lost for the season after injuring his right knee in the third preseason game.

After only playing in 5 games with no starts during his first two years, in 1985, Phil Pozderac injured his knee during the third game of the season, which opened the door for Schultz to start at left tackle, only to return to a backup role when Pozderac was healthy. He eventually regained the starting position from the thirteenth game until the playoffs, but struggled  while playing against the Los Angeles Rams. He was waived on August 26, 1986.

Toronto Argonauts
In 1986, Schultz returned to Canada to play for the Toronto Argonauts of the Canadian Football League (CFL), who owned his rights after drafting him in the first round of the 1982 CFL Draft. He played in 124 games for the Argos over his nine-year career. Schultz was named a CFL All-Star twice (1987, 1988), appeared in the Grey Cup in 1987 and was a member of the 1991 Grey Cup championship team.

In 2007, he was named to the Argonauts All-time team.

Broadcasting career
Schultz was a CFL football sportscaster on The Sports Network from 1998 to 2017. He also co-hosted a weekly one-hour sports radio program on TSN 1050 in Toronto, called Football Sunday with Mike Hogan during the CFL and NFL seasons. He was also the NFL Insider for TSN.

Schultz was announced as a member of the Canadian Football Hall of Fame 2023 class on March 16, 2023, in the media wing.

Personal life
On October 17, 2016, Schultz was part of a class inducted into the Ontario Sports Hall of Fame at the Sheraton Centre Toronto Hotel, where he spoke on the influence his father had on him. 

Schultz died of a heart attack on March 4, 2021, at the age of 61.

References

External links
 Giant Schultz Gives America's Team' A Canadian Flavor

1960 births
2021 deaths
American football offensive tackles
Arizona Wildcats football players
Canadian Football League announcers
Canadian football offensive linemen
Canadian people of German descent
Canadian players of American football
Canadian radio sportscasters
Canadian television sportscasters
Dallas Cowboys players
Players of Canadian football from Ontario
Sportspeople from Burlington, Ontario
Toronto Argonauts players
University of Arizona alumni